The Online Streaming Act, commonly known as Bill C-11, is a proposed bill introduced in the 44th Canadian Parliament. It was first introduced on November 3, 2020, by Minister of Canadian Heritage Steven Guilbeault during the second session of the 43rd Canadian Parliament as An Act to amend the Broadcasting Act and to make related and consequential amendments to other Acts, commonly known as Bill C-10, which passed in the House of Commons on June 22, 2021, but failed to pass the Senate before Parliament was dissolved for a federal election. It was reintroduced with amendments as the Online Streaming Act during the first session of the 44th Canadian Parliament in February 2022, passed in the House of Commons on June 21, 2022, and passed in the Senate on February 2, 2023.  amendments made to the text of the bill in the Senate are being considered by the House of Commons.

The bill seeks to amend the Broadcasting Act to account for the increased prominence of internet video and digital media, and to prioritize the "needs and interests" of Canadians, and the inclusion and involvement of Canadians of diverse backgrounds in broadcast programming. It adds undertakings that conduct "broadcasting" over the internet to the regulatory scope of the Canadian Radio-television and Telecommunications Commission (CRTC), which would give the CRTC the power to regulate almost all audiovisual content distributed via online platforms (including monetized content on social media services). This can include compelling them to make use of Canadian talent, mandating that they make contributions to the Canada Media Fund to support the production of Canadian content, and improve the discoverability of Canadian content on their platforms.   

Alongside this, the bill also removes the seven-year term limit for CRTC-issued broadcast licences (a regulatory process which will not apply to internet broadcasters), adds a mechanism of imposing "conditions" on broadcasters without them being bound to a licence term, and introduces monetary fines for violating orders and regulations issued by the CRTC.

Supporters of the bill state that it would allow the CRTC to compel foreign streaming services to follow similar regulatory obligations to conventional radio and television broadcasters, and government officials projected that mandating participation in the CMF by online broadcasters would result in at least $830 million in additional funding by 2023. The opposition has directed criticism at the bill for granting a large amount of power to the CRTC, who are unelected regulators and receive very little guidance from Parliament or the government. Its unclear applicability to user-generated content on social media services has also faced concerns that it infringes freedom of expression, and that the bill would extraterritorially subject any form of audiovisual content distributed online via platforms accessible by Canadian residents to regulation by the CRTC. The bill has also faced criticism over the lack of transparency in its legislative process, with both instances of the bill having faced arbitrarily limited time periods for their clause-by-clause review, thus limiting the amount of debate and discussion of individual amendments.

History 

On January 19, 2021, the Broadcasting and Telecommunications Legislative Review Panel issued a report to Minister of Heritage Steven Guilbeault and Minister of Innovation, Science and Industry Navdeep Bains, calling for reforms of Canada's broadcasting system to account for digital media. Among other reforms, the panel urgently recommended that any company "with significant Canadian revenues" that distributes or curates audio, audiovisual, or news content be required to register with and be regulated by the CRTC (which the review proposed to be renamed to the "Canadian Communications Commission" to signify its wider scope), and become obligated to make expenditures towards the creation of Canadian content (just as licensed radio and television broadcasters must do under the existing Broadcasting Act and CRTC policy). The CRTC does not currently regulate internet content.

The panel's urgent recommendations were incorporated into Bill C-10. The bill is the first in a series of three bills intended to address online platforms and their influence in Canada, alongside a proposed "online harms" bill that will seek to address online hate speech. On February 16, 2021, the bill completed its second reading and was referred to the Standing Committee on Canadian Heritage (CHPC).

On June 1, 2022, a proposed amendment by the Conservatives to reinstate a clause excluding user-generated content from the scope of the bill, citing various concerns from critics and media outlets, was voted down by the House. The Liberals, with support of the Bloc, subsequently passed a motion of time allocation in order to limit debate of the bill (the first such motion in 20 years, and only the third overall) to five hours, after which the Heritage Committee was required to conclude its clause-by-clause review. Guilbeault cited "systematic obstruction" of the bill by Conservatives.

As a result of the effective "gag order", a number of amendments were voted on with no discussion or publication of the amendments permitted. On June 14, another motion was introduced to only allow one hour of debate for the amended bill when it returned to the House, and only 75 minutes for the third reading. On June 15, the aforementioned amendments were voided by Speaker Anthony Rota, for having been passed by the Heritage Committee after the five-hour period expired. During a late-night session on June 21, most of the voided amendments were reintroduced, and the bill was passed by the House of Commons 196–112 during its third reading. It awaited Senate approval, but was unable to do so before Parliament was dissolved for the 2021 federal election.

The bill was reintroduced in February 2022 as the Online Streaming Act, or Bill C-11 on February 2, 2022. Once again, in June 2022 debate was largely curtailed by providing only three,120-minute sessions for a clause-by-clause review, after which all remaining proposed amendments were voted on with no discussion or publication permitted. 

On May 20, 2022, CRTC Chair Ian Scott stated that the legislation would allow for user-generated content to be regulated but also stated that CRTC would not seek to do so. Minister of Heritage Pablo Rodriguez would later replace Scott with Vicky Eatrides as the new chair of the CRTC on January 5 2023. 

The bill was passed by the House of Commons 208–117 on June 21 during its third reading, and will once again be sent to the Senate for review. Following the successful passage of the bill through the senate, on March 7, 2023, Minister of Heritage Rodrigeuz and his caucus rejected a key amendment by the senate that protected against the regulation of user-generated content.

Contents 
The bill consists primarily of amendments to the Broadcasting Act, along with consequential and related amendments to existing legislation such as Canada's Anti-Spam Legislation, the Cannabis Act, the Copyright Act, and the Canadian Radio-television and Telecommunications Commission Act. The exact regulatory policies would be determined by the CRTC based on its interpretation of the amended Broadcasting Act after royal assent.

Broadcasting policies of Canada 
The broadcasting policy of Canada as defined by the Broadcasting Act is amended, stating that the broadcasting system must serve the needs and interests of all Canadians (including age groups, economic backgrounds, ethnic groups, disabilities, and gender identities among other categories) via programming and employment opportunities.

The CRTC is given the authority to impose conditions on broadcasters to uphold the broadcasting policy of Canada, including the production, presentation, and discoverability of Canadian content, accessibility of content to individuals with disabilities, and other regulatory matters similar to the current conditions of licence used to regulate broadcasters. Conditions would not be bound to licence terms. The licensing framework for broadcasters is modified to remove the seven-year limit for fixed terms, and authorize the CRTC to issue indefinite licences. The CRTC will be prohibited from imposing any obligation on the industry that "does not contribute in a material way to implementing the broadcasting policy for Canada." The Act introduces monetary penalties for violating any regulation or order issued by the CRTC, with fines of up to C$25,000 for the first offence by an individual, and up to $10 million for the first offence by a corporation.

Online undertakings 
The Act is amended to include a definition of online undertakings, which are any internet service that broadcasts programs over the internet (the Act currently defines programs as "sounds or visual images, or a combination of sounds and visual images, that are intended to inform, enlighten or entertain, but does not include visual images, whether or not combined with sounds, that consist predominantly of alphanumeric text").  The definition of broadcast undertaking and broadcasting under the Act would also be amended to include online transmission.

Via the Act, foreign online undertakings are excluded from the requirement that all broadcasters be owned by Canadians, but are compelled to "make the greatest practicable use of Canadian creative and other human resources", and "contribute in an equitable manner to strongly support the creation, production and presentation of Canadian programming". 

Unlike conventional broadcast undertakings, online undertakings are exempt from the requirement that all broadcasters must be licensed. However, the bill would still allow the CRTC to require that all broadcasters (including online undertakings) be registered with the Commission, and to impose regulatory conditions and obligations on them, such as making contributions to the Canada Media Fund, giving prominence to Canadian content on their platforms (although the bill prohibits mandating the use of algorithms to do so), and being compelled to provide information to the Commission on such matters when requested. 

The Act applies to programs on a social media service that are uploaded by "the provider of the service or the provider's affiliate, or the agent or mandatary of either of them", or otherwise covered under regulations created by the CRTC, making regulations that consider (Section 4.2(2)):

 Whether the program generates revenue directly or indirectly
 Whether the program has been broadcast via a broadcast undertaking that must be licensed or registered with the CRTC and not a social media service.
 Whether the program has been "assigned a unique identifier under an international standards system"

Persons are not considered to be carrying on a broadcasting undertaking for the purposes of the Act if:

 They are uploading programs to a social media service for reception by other users, and are not "the provider of the service or the provider’s affiliate, or the agent or mandatary of either of them."
 The transmissions are "ancillary" to a business not normally engaged in broadcasting to the public.
 The transmissions are part of the operations of an educational institution, library, or museum
 The transmissions are part of the operations of a performing arts venue for the purposes of a live presentation.

Reception 
The bill has faced mixed reception. Supporters of the bill argue that it creates a level playing field between legacy and digital broadcast undertakings, and would allow the CRTC to compel foreign streaming services such as Netflix and YouTube to make expenditures towards the production of Canadian content in the same way as conventional broadcasters, and be required to prepare reports to the CRTC on the discoverability of Canadian content on their platforms. Federal officials estimated that mandating participation in the Canada Media Fund by major streaming services could generate up to $830 million in new funding per-year by 2023. Supporters of the bill also argue that it is designed to encourage the production of certified Canadian content, and discourage the practice of "foreign location and service productions" (FLSP) that extensively use Canadian resources and personnel, but do not include Canadians in specific key creative positions.

Critics of the proposed legislation have argued that it gives broad power to the CRTC, who are unelected regulators and receive very little guidance from Parliament or the government, to enforce regulations on digital media platforms. University of Ottawa professor Michael Geist criticized the bill for removing a number of long-standing policies from the Act that were intended to protect Canada's broadcasting system, including the requirement that all broadcasters be Canadian-owned and controlled, and the expectation that broadcasters make "maximum use, and in no case less than predominant use" of Canadian talent in programming.

Applicability to social media 
The bill originally contained a clause, Section 4(1), which excluded programs that are uploaded by users of social media platforms, who are not an owner, operator, or affiliate of the platform, as well as any online undertakings that consist only of such content, from the scope of the Broadcasting Act. It was removed from the bill in April 2021, due to concerns that it could be used as a loophole by video sharing platforms to declare music content as being user-generated because it was uploaded to a musician's own channel, and thus not provide reports on such content to the CRTC. Concerns were raised by critics that removing the clause would place a burden on the operators of social media platforms to regulate user content for compliance with CRTC regulations.  

Former CRTC commissioner Peter Menzies stated that "granting a government agency authority over legal user generated content — particularly when backed up by the government’s musings about taking down websites — doesn’t just infringe on free expression, it constitutes a full-blown assault upon it and, through it, the foundations of democracy." Guilbeault stated that the bill was intended to cover "professional series, films, and music", and argued that the bill included "safeguards" to protect individual users. Liberal MP and Guilbeault's secretary Julie Dabrusin argued that "we do not want to regulate your cat videos."

Conservative Party leader Erin O'Toole commented that Justin Trudeau's government was the most "anti-internet government in Canadian history". Conservative Party heritage critic Alain Rayes stated that "Conservatives support creating a level playing field between large, foreign streaming services and Canadian broadcasters, but not at the cost of Canadians’ fundamental rights and freedoms." Conservative MP Michael Barrett accused the bill of "silencing Canadians online", and argued that Trudeau was attempting to make "every aspect of Canadian life" conform to "his Liberal vision of Canadian society". In response, Trudeau argued that free speech is "not negotiable by our government", and commented that "the tinfoil hats on the other side of the aisle are really quite spectacular." 

On May 3, Guilbeault stated that the bill would be amended to reinstate a more explicit exclusion of user-generated content from the bill, stating that it "is not about what Canadians do online. It is about what the web giants do and don't do, which is to support Canadian stories and music." The amendment adds a statement establishing that the CRTC's powers over social media platforms would be limited to imposing conditions on "the discoverability of Canadian creators"; Geist criticized the amendment for merely confirming the CRTC's regulatory powers and "doubling down on [the government's] Internet regulation plans."  

On May 9 in an interview with CTV's political talk show Question Period, Guilbeault stated that the Broadcasting Act as amended by the bill "should apply to people who are broadcasters, or act like broadcasters", and suggested that social media users that have a large audience or derive a large amount of revenue (insofar that they have a "material impact on the Canadian economy") would also be classified as broadcasters. 

Concerns were raised over the comments, as they had contradicted Guilbeault's previous assurance that the Act would not apply to individual users of social networks, and it was unclear what the threshold would be under this criteria. Guilbeault later admitted that he had used "unclear language" during the Question Period interview, and argued that individual persons would not be considered broadcasters under the Act, and that social media platforms would be regulated when they themselves "produce content for Canadians to watch or listen to — for broadcast." Regarding social media platforms likely being required to improve the discoverability of Canadian content, he explained that "it does not mean the CRTC would dictate, limit or prohibit a feed or what you can post, watch or listen to on social media. As the Internet is infinite, discoverability won’t limit the content you see on a feed – it will just add more."

On May 9, Kate Taylor of The Globe and Mail published an opinion piece in support of the bill, stating that concerns over the bill were being "overblown" by the Conservatives, that the Broadcasting Act has always required that it be applied by the CRTC "in a manner that is consistent with the freedom of expression and journalistic, creative and programming independence", and that all Canadian creators "deserve a broadcasting law that offers basic fairness".

The Conservative Party and the NDP supported a motion to reassess the bill's compliance with the Charter of Rights and Freedoms ("charter statement"). On May 10, 2021, members of Parliament on the Heritage Committee voted in favour of a motion requesting a new charter statement, and that Guilbeault and Minister of Justice and Attorney General David Lametti appear before the committee and an expert panel to discuss the implications of the amendments to the bill. That night, Guilbeault shared a Medium post on Twitter which conspired that opposition to the bill was the product of "public opinion being manipulated at scale through a deliberate campaign of misinformation by commercial interests that would prefer to avoid the same regulatory oversight applied to broadcast media." 

On May 13, the Department of Justice issued the new charter statement, finding that the current draft was compatible with the Charter, citing that the CRTC would not be able to impose the regulations on individual users, and would have to interpret the Act "in a manner consistent with freedom of expression". Geist felt that the charter statement did not address the main concern of allowing the CRTC to regulate the presentation of Canadian content on internet platforms, stating that "suddenly now we're going to ask the CRTC to decide which cat video constitutes Canadian content, and which one doesn't."

On May 19, the Heritage Committee voted in favour of an amendment by the Bloc Québécois that ensures that the CRTC would only be allowed to enforce conditions on the promotion of Canadian content by social media platforms that are consistent with the Charter right to freedom of expression.

Upon its reintroduction as the Online Streaming Act, Section 4(1) was restored, but is now accompanied by an additional section stating that a program could still fall under the Act based on CRTC regulations, based on whether the content is being monetized, was broadcast on a CRTC-licensed undertaking, or is "assigned a unique identifier under an international standards system". Geist also noted that some of the "safeguards" that had been added to the bill as Bill C-10 were removed, and concluded that "there was an opportunity to use the re-introduction of the bill to fully exclude user generated content (no other country in the world regulates content this way), limit the scope of the bill to a manageable size, and create more certainty and guidance for the CRTC. Instead, the government has left the prospect of treating Internet content as programs subject to regulation in place, envisioned the entire globe as subject to Canadian broadcast jurisdiction, increased the power of the regulator, and done little to answer many of the previously unanswered questions." Canadian YouTuber J.J. McCullough argued that changes to recommendation algorithms to promote Canadian content as proposed under the bill could impact the discoverability of Canadian creators.

Geist also felt that the bill had failed to account for foreign productions that extensively leverage Canadian talent and resources and can be mistaken for Canadian content, but fail to meet the requirements for certification due to factors such as foreign ownership of the production.

Liberal MP Tim Louis claimed that criticism of the provisions was based on "misinformation".

In August 2022, it was reported based on documents from an Access to Information Act request, that the removal of Section 4(1) from the original version of the bill was the result of lobbying by Friends of Canadian Broadcasting and the Coalition for the Diversity of Cultural Expressions (CDCE). Friends was opposed to the regulation of users, but did support the regulation of social media companies themselves.

Various amendments have been introduced and approved as part of its Senate review. On December 6, 2022, amendments were agreed upon by the committee that would require online undertakings to "implement methods such as age verification" to prevent minors from accessing programs containing sexually explicit content. Another amendment replaces Section 4.2(2) in the definition of a program, attempting to scale back its scope by only covering programs that are or contain commercially-released music recordings, and programs broadcast by undertakings "required to be carried on under a license" or "required to be registered with the Commission but does not provide a social media service." On March 7, 2023, Minister of Heritage Rodrigeuz and his caucus rejected a key amendment by the senate that protected against the regulation of user-generated content.

Notes

References 

43rd Canadian Parliament
44th Canadian Parliament
Canadian federal legislation
 Proposed laws of Canada
2020 in Canadian law
2021 in Canadian law
2022 in Canadian law
 Freedom of expression in Canada